The Mahindra XUV700 is a compact crossover SUV produced by the Indian automobile manufacturer Mahindra & Mahindra. Introduced in August 2021, the vehicle is positioned to replace the XUV500.

Overview 
The vehicle was introduced on 14 August 2021. The XUV700 was originally designed as the second-generation XUV500, however Mahindra decided to reposition the model nomenclature due to its plan of expanding its SUV portfolio. It is their first model to use the new Mahindra logo, which is reserved for their SUV products.

It is offered with one petrol engine and one diesel engine option. The diesel option is a 2.2-litre four-cylinder mHawk turbodiesel. Both engines can be had with 6-speed manual and 6-speed automatic transmission options, while the lower-spec diesel variant will only be available with a manual transmission. An all-wheel-drive variant is also available. It can reach speeds of upto 60 kmph in 5 seconds and reach 100 kmph from a standstill in 10 seconds. Its tagline is 'Feel the rush.'.

The XUV700 is available in two series, which are MX and AdrenoX (AX). The MX series has a single MX trim, while the AdrenoX series consists of four trim levels, which are AX3, AX5, AX7 and AX7L. The AdrenoX series is equipped with the eponymous AdrenoX, an Amazon Alexa-based voice command. Both 5-seater and 7-seater configurations are available. The top-end variant is also equipped with advanced driver assistance system (ADAS) technology tuned for Indian road conditions, making it the first Mahindra product to receive Level 1 autonomous tech. Variants include MX, AX3, AX5, AX7, and AX7L, which is the top model.

Safety 
Mahindra XUV700 achieved a 5 star rating for adult occupant protection and 4 stars for child occupant protection in 2021 Global NCAP tests (identical to Latin NCAP 2013). The vehicle tested was the most basic safety specification, fitted with two airbags, ABS and ISOFIX anchorages. The model presented low risk of injury to most body regions in the frontal impact and passed regulatory ECE95 side impact requirements.

In June 2022 the XUV700 achieved a Global NCAP Safer Choice award for performance of its optional Electronic Stability Control and its pedestrian protection performance in adult and child head impacts and adult lower leg impact according to UN127 regulation.

Awards 
In 2022 Mahindra XUV700 achieved the Autocar Car of the Year award and also Indian Car of the Year 2022. The XUV700 achieved Global NCAP's Safer Choice Award.

References

External links 

 Official website

XUV700
Compact sport utility vehicles
Crossover sport utility vehicles
Global NCAP small off-road
Front-wheel-drive vehicles
All-wheel-drive vehicles
Cars introduced in 2021